Piotr Przydział (born 15 May 1974) is a Polish former racing cyclist. He won the Tour de Pologne 2000. He also rode in the men's road race at the 2000 Summer Olympics.

Major results

1994
 1st Overall Tour of Małopolska
1998
 1st  National Time Trial Championships 
1999
 1st Stage 8 Volta a Portugal
 1st Stage 8 Peace Race
 2nd National Road Race Championships
2000
 1st Overall Tour de Pologne
 2nd Overall Szlakiem Grodów Piastowskich
 2nd Overall Peace Race
2001
 1st  National Time Trial Championships 
 1st Majowy Wyścig Klasyczny–Lublin
 1st Overall Bałtyk–Karkonosze Tour
 3rd Overall Course de la Solidarité Olympique
 3rd Overall Tour of Małopolska
1st Stages 2 & 4
 3rd Overall Tour de Pologne
2002
 1st Stages 4 & 10 Peace Race
2003
 1st  National Road Race Championships
2004
 1st Overall Szlakiem Grodów Piastowskich
1st Stage 4
 1st Majowy Wyścig Klasyczny–Lublin
2005
 1st Grand Prix Kooperativa
 3rd Overall Szlakiem Grodów Piastowskich

References

External links

1974 births
Living people
Polish male cyclists
People from Ropczyce-Sędziszów County
Cyclists at the 2000 Summer Olympics
Olympic cyclists of Poland
Sportspeople from Podkarpackie Voivodeship